Ones and Zeros is the second full-length release by Canadian indie rock group Immaculate Machine. It is their first official release through Mint Records. Music videos were released for the songs "Broken Ship" and "So Cynical". Six of the songs on this album were translated into French and appear on Immaculate Machine's 2006 EP Les Uns Mais Pas Les Autres.

Track listing
All songs by Immaculate Machine
 "Broken Ship" – 3:33
 "No Such Thing as the Future" – 3:06
 "Fire in the Lobby" – 3:43
 "Phone No." – 3:38
 "On/Off" – 2:25
 "Invention '77" – 4:15
 "So Cynical" – 3:41
 "No Way Out" – 4:36
 "Army" – 3:25
 "Two Places" – 3:56
 "Latest Breaking News" – 4:00
 "Don't Leave Without Us" – 2:33
 "Statue" – 4:56

Personnel
Kathryn Calder – keyboards, vocals
Brooke Gallupe – guitar, vocals
Luke Kozlowski – drums, vocals
Caitlin Gallupe – artwork
Randy Iwata – additional layout
Silas Pronk – original cover photo

2005 albums
Immaculate Machine albums
Mint Records albums